Thomas, Tom, or Tommy Sullivan may refer to:

Entertainment
 Thomas Russell Sullivan (1849–1916), American writer
 Thomas Sullivan (author), American author of short stories and novels
 Thomas E. Sullivan, an actor known for Marvel's Agents of S.H.I.E.L.D.
 Thomas M. Sullivan (born c. 1949), American radio talk show host and television show host
 Thomas Michael Sullivan, actor, producer, and founding member of Stage 13
 Tom Sullivan (radio and television personality), Atlanta radio and television personality
 Tom Sullivan (singer) (born 1947), blind singer, actor, author
 Tommy Sullivan, singer and saxophonist for Johnny Maestro & the Brooklyn Bridge
 Tom Sullivan (special effects artist), American effects artist, makeup artist, and actor

Politics
 Thomas A. Sullivan (1855–1946), American politician
 Thomas L. Sullivan (1846–1936), mayor of Indianapolis, Indiana
 Thomas J. Sullivan (1845–1908), director of the U.S. Bureau of Engraving and Printing
 Tom Sullivan (Idaho politician) (born 1968), Idaho Senate candidate
 Tom Sullivan (Colorado politician) (born 1956), American politician and member of the Colorado House of Representatives
 Thomas F. Sullivan (1878–1957), American government official

Sports 
Tom Sullivan (1880s pitcher) (1860–1947), American baseball player
Tom Sullivan (1920s pitcher) (1895–1962), American baseball player
Tom Sullivan (catcher) (1906–1944), American baseball player
Tom Sullivan (American football) (1950–2002), American football running back
 Thomas Sullivan (American football) (1892–1958), American college football player and coach
Tom Sullivan (basketball) (born 1950), college basketball coach
Tom Sullivan (boxer) (1922–1959), killed by mob
Tom Sullivan (rower) (1868–1949), New Zealand oarsman
Tommy Sullivan (curler) (born 1977), Canadian curler

Other
 Thomas Crook Sullivan (1833–1908), American general
 Thomas Sullivan (Medal of Honor, 1869) (1840s–?), for service with the 1st Cavalry in the Chiricahua Mountains
 Thomas Sullivan (Medal of Honor, 1890) (1859–1940), for service at the Battle of Wounded Knee
 Thomas P. Sullivan, American attorney

See also
Thomas O'Sullivan (disambiguation)